The 15 cm sIG 33 (schweres Infanterie Geschütz 33, lit. "Heavy Infantry Gun") was the standard German heavy infantry gun used in the Second World War. It was the largest weapon ever classified as an infantry gun by any nation.

Its weight made it difficult to use in the field, and the gun was increasingly adapted to various ad hoc mobile mountings. These were generically referred to as the SIG 33.

Development 
Sources differ on the development history, but the gun itself was of conventional design. Early production models were horse-drawn, with wooden wheels. Later production models had pressed steel wheels, with solid rubber tires and air brakes for motor towing, albeit at a low speed (only carriages with pneumatic tires and suspension system could be towed at highway speeds). As with most German artillery carriages, the solid rubber tires and lack of springing meant that the gun could not safely be towed above 10 mph, and horse-drawing was still extensively employed.

The sIG 33 was rather heavy for its mission, and it was redesigned in the late 1930s to incorporate light alloys. A new carriage, made entirely of light alloys, was tested around 1939, but was not accepted for service.

Ammunition 
Most of the shells used by the sIG 33 were unexceptional in design. The Stielgranate 42 was an exception. The finned projectile was mounted in front and outside of the barrel on a muzzle-loaded driving rod, and fired with a special propellant charge. The Stielgranate 42 was designed for demolition and obstacle clearance, unlike the previous anti-tank Stielgranate 41.

See also
SIG 33 Self-Propelled Artillery

Notes

References

 Chamberlain, Peter, and Hilary L. Doyle. Thomas L. Jentz (Technical Editor). Encyclopedia of German Tanks of World War Two: A Complete Illustrated Directory of German Battle Tanks, Armoured Cars, Self-propelled Guns, and Semi-tracked Vehicles, 1933–1945. London: Arms and Armour Press, 1978 (revised edition 1993). 
 Engelmann, Joachim and Scheibert, Horst. Deutsche Artillerie 1934-1945: Eine Dokumentation in Text, Skizzen und Bildern: Ausrüstung, Gliederung, Ausbildung, Führung, Einsatz. Limburg/Lahn, Germany: C. A. Starke, 1974
 Gander, Terry and Chamberlain, Peter. Weapons of the Third Reich: An Encyclopedic Survey of All Small Arms, Artillery and Special Weapons of the German Land Forces 1939-1945. New York: Doubleday, 1979 
 Hogg, Ian V. German Artillery of World War Two. 2nd corrected edition. Mechanicsville, PA: Stackpole Books, 1997 
 Trojca, Waldemar and Jaugitz, Markus. Sturmtiger and Sturmpanzer in Combat. Katowice, Poland: Model Hobby, 2008 
 Infanteriegeschütze : lexikon-der-wehrmacht.de (German)
 15-cm Heavy Infantry Howitzer, German Infantry Weapons, Military Intelligence Service, Special Series No. 14, May 25, 1943.

World War II field artillery
World War II artillery of Germany
150 mm artillery
Military equipment introduced in the 1920s